Louis Willoughby (10 July 1876 – 12 September 1968) was an English actor of the silent era.

Born in England, he was married to artist Vera Willoughby and the father of artist Althea Willoughby. He lived his final years in the United States, where he died in Clearwater, Florida.

Selected filmography
 A Pair of Silk Stockings (1918)
 The Temple of Dusk (1918)
 The Model's Confession (1918)
 Midnight Madness (1918)
 Sauce for the Goose (1918)
 Mirandy Smiles (1918)
 Treasure of the Sea (1918)
 The Artistic Temperament (1919)
 Colonel Newcombe the Perfect Gentleman (1920)
 Risky Business (1920)
Desperate Youth (1921)
 The Scarlet Lady (1922)
 Was She Guilty? (1922)
 Mr. Barnes of New York (1922)
 Lamp in the Desert (1922)
 Trapped by the Mormons (1922)
 Shifting Sands (1922)

References

External links
 

1876 births
1968 deaths
English male silent film actors
20th-century English male actors
20th-century British male actors
British emigrants to the United States